Woollum is an unincorporated community within Knox County, Kentucky, United States. It was also known as Woollur.

References

Unincorporated communities in Knox County, Kentucky
Unincorporated communities in Kentucky